Tin City is an abandoned town except for a nearby minimally manned radar station,   located at  in the Nome Census Area of the U.S. state of Alaska.

They also have the nearby Tin City LRRS (Long Range Radar Site) Airport.

History
Tin ore was discovered on Cape Mountain in July 1902. A mining camp was established at the base of the mountain in 1903 and the Tin City post office was opened in 1904. By 1907 it had a few widely scattered houses and two companies operating out of the village.  The post office closed in 1909.

Climate
Tin City has a tundra climate (ET) with short but cool summers and long, bitterly cold winters. Precipitation peaks during August. Snowfall is the heaviest during early winter.

References

Geography of Nome Census Area, Alaska
Ghost towns in Alaska
Mining communities in Alaska
Ghost towns in the United States
Ghost towns in North America
Towns in the United States